David Barry, 1st Earl of Barrymore (1605–1642), 6th Viscount Buttevant from 1617 to 1628, was a Protestant native Irish peer. He died of wounds received at the battle of Battle of Liscarroll in September 1642.

Birth and Origins 

David was born on 10 March 1605, probably at Buttevant, County Cork, a posthumous child of David de Barry and his wife Elizabeth Power. His father was an heir apparent who never acceded. David's grandfather was David de Barry, 5th Viscount Buttevant. The Barrys were an Old English family who had come from Wales at the time of the Anglo-Norman invasion of Ireland.

His mother was a daughter of Richard Power, 4th Baron le Power and Curraghmore.

Early life and marriage 
He succeeded as 6th Viscount Buttevant on 10 April 1617 on the death of his grandfather.  Through Cork's influence, he was created Earl of Barrymore on 28 February 1628

Marriage and children 
In 1631 Buttevant, as he was now, married Alice Boyle, daughter of Richard Boyle, 1st Earl of Cork, by his second wife, Catherine Fenton.

Irish wars 
During the 1641 rebellion, he quite naturally sided with the Crown upon whom his title and lands depended. When the relellion spread into Munster, he fought vigourously against the insurgents. On 10 May 1642, he stormed the Castle of Ballymacpatrick (now Careysville), near Fermoy, which was held by his grand-aunt, and hanged forty of the rebel leaders before breakfast. On 16 May, he lost Barrymore Castle at Castlelyons, his seat, to Maurice Roche, Viscount Fermoy and Donough MacCarty, 2nd Viscount Muskerry.

He led a regiment at the Battle of Liscarroll in September 1642. He died two weeks later on 29 September 1642 at his house in Castle Lyons probably of wounds received at the battle. He was buried in the Boyle Vault, Youghal, County Cork, by his grieving father-in-law, Richard Boyle.

Notes and references

Notes

Citations

Sources 
 
 
  – Ab-Adam to Basing (for Barrymore)
 
 
 

 

1600s births
1642 deaths
David
Earls of Barrymore